This is a list of memorials to Thomas Jefferson, the 3rd president of the United States and the author of the United States Declaration of Independence.

Buildings

Elementary schools
Jefferson Elementary School, in Cammack Village, Arkansas
Thomas Jefferson Elementary, Anaheim, California
Thomas Jefferson Elementary, Burbank, California
 Jefferson Elementary School (Corona, California), part of Corona-Norco Unified School District
Thomas Jefferson Elementary, Glendale, California
 Jefferson Elementary School (Redondo Beach, California)
 Jefferson Elementary School (Santa Ana, California)
Thomas Jefferson Elementary School, Honolulu, Hawaii
 Thomas Jefferson Elementary, Chicago, Illinois
 Jefferson Elementary School (Vandalia, Illinois)
 Jefferson Elementary School (Washington, Indiana)
 Jefferson Elementary School (Creston, Iowa)
 Jefferson School (Massachusetts), a historic school building in Weymouth, Massachusetts
 Jefferson Elementary School (Winona, Minnesota)
 Jefferson School (Cape Girardeau, Missouri), a historic school building
 Jefferson Elementary School (Westfield, New Jersey)
Jefferson Elementary, Huntington, New York
Thomas Jefferson, Morristown, New Jersey 
Jefferson School, Union City, New Jersey
Thomas Jefferson, Baltimore, Maryland
Jefferson-Barnes Elementary, Westland, Michigan (closed)
 Jefferson Schoolhouse, a historic building in Indian Hill, Ohio
 Jefferson Elementary School (Pottstown, Pennsylvania)
 Jefferson School (Clifton Forge, Virginia), a historic school building
 Thomas Jefferson Elementary School (Falls Church, Virginia), part of Falls Church City Public Schools
 Jefferson Elementary School (Spokane, Washington)
 Jefferson Elementary School (Tacoma, Washington), part of Tacoma Public Schools

High schools

Jefferson County High School (Arkansas), in Pine Bluff, Arkansas, later known as Coleman High School
 Jefferson High School (Daly City, California)
 Jefferson High School (Los Angeles), California
 Jefferson High School (Mt. Shasta, California)
 Bellarmine-Jefferson High School, in Burbank, California
Thomas Jefferson High School (Denver), Colorado 
 Jefferson High School (Edgewater, Colorado)
 Thomas Jefferson High School (Tampa, Florida)
Jefferson County High School (Florida), in Jefferson County, Florida
Jefferson County High School (Georgia), in Louisville, Georgia
 Thomas Jefferson Academy (Georgia)
Thomas Jefferson High School (Rockford, Illinois)
 Jefferson High School (Indiana)
 Jefferson High School (Cedar Rapids, Iowa)
Thomas Jefferson High School (Council Bluffs, Iowa)
Jefferson County High School (Kentucky), in Jefferson County, Kentucky
Thomas Jefferson High School (Gretna, Louisiana)
 East Jefferson High School, in Metairie, Louisiana
 West Jefferson High School (Louisiana), in Harvey, Louisiana
 Jefferson Schools, a public school district in Frenchtown Charter Township, Michigan
 Jefferson High School (Alexandria, Minnesota), now Alexandria Area High School
 Jefferson High School (Bloomington, Minnesota)
Jefferson County High School (Mississippi), in Jefferson County, Mississippi
Jefferson High School (Missouri), in Conception Junction, Missouri
Thomas Jefferson School (St. Louis, Missouri), a coeducational boarding and day school
 Jefferson High School (Montana)
Thomas Jefferson High School (New Jersey)
 Jefferson Township High School (New Jersey), in Oak Ridge, New Jersey
 Thomas Jefferson Arts Academy, a public high school in Elizabeth, New Jersey
Thomas Jefferson High School (Brooklyn), New York 
Thomas Jefferson High School (Rochester, New York)
 Thomas Jefferson Academy (North Carolina)
 Jefferson High School (Delphos, Ohio)
 Jefferson Township High School (Ohio), in Dayton, Ohio
 Jefferson Area High School (Jefferson, Ohio)
 Jefferson High School (Portland, Oregon)
 Jefferson High School (Jefferson, Oregon)
Thomas Jefferson High School (Jefferson Hills, Pennsylvania)
 Thomas Jefferson School (Philadelphia, Pennsylvania), listed on the National Register of Historic Places, now Bodine High School for International Affairs
Thomas Jefferson High School (South Dakota)
Jefferson County High School (Tennessee), in Jefferson County, Tennessee
Thomas Jefferson High School (Dallas), Texas 
 Jefferson High School (El Paso, Texas)
 Jefferson High School (Jefferson, Texas)
Thomas Jefferson High School (Port Arthur, Texas)
 Thomas Jefferson High School (San Antonio), Texas
Thomas Jefferson High School (1964–1987), in Alexandria, Virginia
Thomas Jefferson High School for Science and Technology, in Alexandria, Virginia
Jefferson School (Charlottesville, Virginia), a historic school building
Thomas Jefferson High School (Richmond, Virginia)
Thomas Jefferson High School (Auburn, Washington)
 Jefferson High School (Shenandoah Junction, West Virginia)
 Jefferson High School (Jefferson, Wisconsin), whose old building is listed on the National Register of Historic Places

In fiction
 Jefferson High School, in Happy Days

Junior High schools

Middle schools

Universities and colleges
Jefferson State Community College, Birmingham, Alabama
Thomas Jefferson School of Law, San Diego, California
Jefferson Community and Technical College, Louisville, Kentucky
Jefferson College (Louisiana), a former college in Convent, Louisiana
Jefferson College (Mississippi), Washington, Mississippi
Jefferson College (Missouri), Hillsboro, Missouri
Jefferson Community College (Watertown, New York)
Washington & Jefferson College, Washington, Pennsylvania
Thomas Jefferson University, Philadelphia, Pennsylvania
Jefferson College of Health Sciences, Roanoke, Virginia

Other schools

 Instituto Thomas Jefferson, a private K-12 school located in Tlalnepantla de Baz, Mexico

 Jefferson High School Online, a diploma mill
Jefferson School of Social Science (1944-1956), a New York City adult education and training facility of the Communist Party USA

Other buildings
 Jefferson Hotel in Richmond, Virginia
 Jefferson Hotel in Washington, D.C.
 Jefferson Memorial
 Thomas Jefferson Building, Library of Congress, Washington, D.C.
 Thomas Jefferson Library, University of Missouri-St.Louis
 Thomas Jefferson National Accelerator Facility, Newport News, Virginia
 Thomas Jefferson State Office Building, Jefferson City, Missouri

Cities, towns and villages
 Jefferson, Georgia
 Jefferson, Maine
 Jefferson, New Hampshire, first municipality named for Jefferson
 Jefferson, Ohio
 Jefferson, Oregon
 Jefferson, South Dakota
 Jefferson, Texas
 Jefferson, Wisconsin
 Jefferson City, Missouri, state capital
 Jefferson City, Tennessee
 Jefferson Hills, Pennsylvania
 Jefferson Township, New Jersey
 Jeffersontown, Kentucky
 Port Jefferson, New York

Counties
 Jefferson County, Alabama
 Jefferson County, Arkansas
 Jefferson County, Colorado
 Jefferson County, Iowa
 Jefferson County, Indiana
 Jefferson County, Kentucky
 Jefferson County, Missouri
 Jefferson County, Montana
 Jefferson County, New York
 Jefferson County, Ohio
 Jefferson County, Oklahoma
 Jefferson County, Pennsylvania
 Jefferson County, Tennessee
 Jefferson County, Washington
 Jefferson County, West Virginia
 Jefferson Parish, Louisiana
It is notable that Jefferson County in Virginia became part of West Virginia as a result of the American Civil War. Virginia sued West Virginia to regain it, but lost the case before the United States Supreme Court when it was decided in 1871.

Mountains
Mountain peaks named after Jefferson
 Jefferson Rock, West Virginia

Parks
 Gateway Arch National Park in St. Louis, Missouri, was named Jefferson National Expansion Memorial from 1935 until 2018
Jefferson Park (Chicago), a historic park listed on the National Register of Historic Places in the Chicago community area of the same name
Jefferson Pools, the oldest US spa buildings, where President Jefferson bathed, in Warm Springs, Virginia
 Thomas Jefferson Park, in New York City

Streets
 Jefferson Highway, running from New Orleans to Winnipeg
 Jefferson Road, Metro Detroit, Michigan
 Jefferson Blvd. Los Angeles, California
 Jefferson Drive on the National Mall, Washington, DC
 Jefferson Street, Miami Beach, Florida
 Jefferson Ave. Newport News, Virginia
 Thomas Jefferson Parkway. Charlottesville, Virginia
 Jefferson Avenue, Winnipeg, Manitoba
 Jefferson Blvd. Fort Wayne, Indiana
 Jefferson Avenue, Buffalo, New York

Other
 Jefferson (South state), a 1915 proposed state
 Jefferson (Pacific state), a 1941 proposed state
 Jefferson Health, a regional health system headquartered at Thomas Jefferson University Hospital in Philadelphia
 Jefferson Schools, a school district in Frenchtown Charter Township, Michigan
 Jefferson Territory
 Jefferson Park, Chicago, one of Chicago's 77 community areas on the city's Northwest Side
 Memorial to the 56 Signers of the Declaration of Independence
 Minor planet 30928 Jefferson is named in his honor

See also
Jefferson (disambiguation)
Presidential memorials in the United States

References

Jefferson, Thomas
Jefferson
Jefferson, Thomas
Monuments and memorials to Thomas Jefferson
Thomas Jefferson-related lists